Dougald Park is an American television and film actor.

He has had roles in films such as Bruce Almighty, Shadow Box and Indio, USA.  He has appeared in recurring and minor roles in TV series such as Scrubs, Desperate Housewives, Alias, Judging Amy, Numb3rs, The West Wing, Brothers & Sisters and Las Vegas.

External links
 

American male television actors
American male film actors
Year of birth missing (living people)
Living people